is a Japanese former football player. He played for Japan national team. His brother Yuto Sato is also a footballer.

Club career
Born in Kasukabe, Saitama, Japan, Sato is a product of JEF United Ichihara's youth system. He was promoted to JEF's top team in 2000. His first league appearance came on April 15, 2000, against Júbilo Iwata. He scored his first league goal on March 21, 2001, against Júbilo Iwata.

Frustrated with a lack of playing time, Sato decided to move to J2 League side Cerezo Osaka in 2002. Cerezo's coach Akihiro Nishimura rated him highly, as he had also managed Sato for Japan's youth team the previous year. However, Sato suffered from Guillain–Barré syndrome at the beginning of the season, and found himself playing not many games with Akinori Nishizawa and Yoshito Okubo ahead of him in the pecking order. The club finished 2nd and was promoted to J1 League.

Sato was loaned out to J1 side Vegalta Sendai in the 2003 season. He finally became a first-choice forward, playing 30 games and scoring 9 goals. Despite his efforts, Sendai was relegated to J2. His loan contract became a permanent one and he played 44 league games with 20 goals for Sendai in the 2005 season but failed to navigate the club to J1.

He was transferred to J1 side Sanfrecce Hiroshima in the 2005 season. He scored 18 goals during his first season with the club, including two hat-tricks.

On April 22, 2006, Sato set the record for the fastest goal in J1 League history, scoring just 8 seconds after kick-off against Cerezo Osaka.

On November 22, 2015, he equalled Masashi Nakayama as the all-time top-scorer in the J1 League with 157 goals. After equalling the record, having spent 12 years in Hiroshima, Sato decided to sign for J2 club Nagoya Grampus.

Grampus finished at the 3rd place in 2017 season and was promoted to J1. Although Sato played many matches in 2017, he could not play many matches in 2018.

In 2019, Sato re-joined J2 club JEF United Chiba (formerly JEF United Ichihara) for the first time in 18 years. He retired at the end of the 2020 season.

International career
In June 2001, Sato made the Japan U-20 national team squad for the 2001 World Youth Championship. At this tournament, he played 2 matches.

Sato made his international debut for Japan on February 11, 2006, in a friendly against the United States. He scored his first international goal on February 22, 2006, in an 2007 Asian Cup qualification against India. In the run-up to the 2006 World Cup, he was regularly picked for the Japan national team, but he was left out of the final squad by national coach Zico.

Sato was a member of the Japan team for the 2007 Asian Cup finals and played four games in the tournament, all as a substitute. He played 31 games and scored 4 goals for Japan until 2010.

Style of play
Sato has cited Filippo Inzaghi as his inspiration; his playing style has often been described as being similar to that of the Italian former striker.

Personal life
His twin brother Yuto is also a professional footballer who plays for JEF United Chiba and has been capped once at international level.

Career statistics

Club

1Includes J1/J2 Play-offs, Japanese Super Cup, FIFA Club World Cup and J.League Championship.

International

International goals

Honors

Club
Sanfrecce Hiroshima
 J1 League: 2012, 2013, 2015
 J2 League: 2008
 Japanese Super Cup: 2008, 2013, 2014, 2016

Individual
 J1 League Best Eleven: 2005, 2012
 J2 League: Top scorer: 2008
 J1 League: Top scorer: 2012
 J.League Most Valuable Player: 2012

References

External links

 
 
 
 
  
 Profile at Nagoya Grampus

1982 births
Living people
Association football forwards
Association football people from Saitama Prefecture
Japanese footballers
Japan youth international footballers
Japan international footballers
J1 League players
J2 League players
JEF United Chiba players
Cerezo Osaka players
Vegalta Sendai players
Sanfrecce Hiroshima players
Nagoya Grampus players
J1 League Player of the Year winners
2007 AFC Asian Cup players
Japanese twins
Twin sportspeople
Presidents of the Japan Pro-Footballers Association